State Road 8 (NM 8) is a primarily north–south state highway in the state of New Mexico. NM 8's southern terminus is at NM 176 west of Eunice, and the northern terminus is at U.S. Route 62 (US 62)/US 180 west of Hobbs.

Route description
State Road 8 begins at its junction with NM 176 west of Eunice. From there, the highway runs north traveling through largely rural land until reaching its northern terminus with US Routes 62 and 180 west of Hobbs.

History
NM 8 previously extended further south along NM 176, past the Eunice Airport and into Eunice. The route was truncated to its current southern terminus by the state transportation commission on May 25, 2006.

Major intersections

See also

References

External links

008
Transportation in Lea County, New Mexico